Royal Air Force Finningley or RAF Finningley was a Royal Flying Corps and Royal Air Force station at Finningley, in the Metropolitan Borough of Doncaster, South Yorkshire, England. The station straddled the historic county boundaries of both Nottinghamshire and the West Riding of Yorkshire.

RAF Finningley was decommissioned in 1996.  The airfield was developed into an international airport named Doncaster Sheffield Airport, which opened on 28 April 2005. The closure of the airport was announced in September 2022 with the final passenger flight arriving on 4 November 2022.

History

Origins 

During the refurbishment of the Royal Flying Corps station at Doncaster in 1915 a decision was taken to move operations temporarily to an air strip at Bancroft Farm at Finningley.

This flight of aircraft is thought to have consisted of Royal Aircraft Factory BE.2c fighters. These fighters were used to intercept Zeppelin bombers approaching Yorkshire cities from the East Coast, in this instance, the heavily industrialised City of Sheffield.

Finningley became a Royal Flying Corps Military Airfield in 1915.

Second World War 

Finningley's participation in RAF Bomber Command's offensive may have been short but the station played a vital part in finishing crews with operational training for the bombing role. An early pre-war expansion scheme airfield the site, farmland in a well wooded locality four miles southeast of Doncaster was acquired in the summer of 1935. The Doncaster-Lincoln railway line ran a quarter mile to the north and Finningley village lay a similar distance to the east. Four Type C hangars were erected in the usual crescent layout facing the bombing circle, with a fifth directly behind the southernmost of the line. Administration and technical site buildings were immediately to the rear of the hangars.

Nos. 7 and 102 RAF Squadrons moved in during August 1936 from RAF Worthy Down with Handley Page Heyfords; this was earlier than the official opening date given in station records (3 September). During the next year, No. 7 Squadron split into No. 76 and No. 102 similarly divided to produce No. 77 the latter two soon being moved south to RAF Honington. No. 7 Squadron converted to Whitleys in March and April 1938 while No. 76 continued to operate Wellesleys, the type it had been formed to fly. By the end of that year No. 5 Group completed its acquisition of No. 3 Group stations north of the Wash and, under its control, Finningley squadrons started conversion to the Handley Page Hampden, with Avro Ansons to fill out strength until more of this new type were available from production.

The need to establish units devoted to training crews on the new bomber types resulted in the setting up of so-called pool squadrons during the summer of 1939. A revision of this arrangement brought the designated pool squadrons into operational training units and, shortly after war was declared, both the Finningley squadrons moved to RAF Upper Heyford to form one of these organisations.

Finningley was to continue in a training role for No. 106 Squadron, which brought its Hampdens from RAF Cottesmore in October. Also classed as a reserve squadron, No. 106 continued the operational training role for No. 5 Group that the previous occupants had started to provide.

During early 1940, Fairey Battles of 98 Squadron were moved to RAF Finningley from RAF Scampton.

By August 1940 the critical war situation caused No. 106 to be placed on operational call. Most of its early sorties were to drop mines in the approaches to French Channel ports thought to be harbouring invasion barges.  There was still need for a final polish for new Hampden crews and in February 1941 No. 106 left its 'C' Flight at Finningley to continue with this task while the rest of the squadron moved to RAF Coningsby for full offensive operations. While flying from Finningley, six Hampdens had failed to return. In March the former No. 106 "C" Flight metamorphosised into No. 25 OTU, initially continuing to train with Hampdens and Ansons. A few Manchesters arrived in the spring of 1941, and the unit was later bolstered with Wellingtons.

Early in 1942 Finningley passed to No. 1 Group and with no further need for Hampdens or Manchesters No. 25 OTU concentrated on Wellingtons, nine of which were lost when the station was called upon to take part in Bomber Command operations. No. 25 OTU was disbanded in February 1943 and in March No. 18 OTU moved in from RAF Bramcote and began using RAF Bircotes and RAF Worksop as satellites. In November the Wellingtons were moved to these satellites as hard runways were to be laid at Finningley. These were put down during the winter of 1943–44, the main 03-21 being , 07-25  and 12–30 4,200 ft. A concrete perimeter track had been laid in The 1942 and asphalt pan-type hardstandings constructed in 1940–41 linked to it, two of the original clusters crossing the A614 road between Finningley village and Bawtry. A single loop-type standing was added to bring the total to 36. Some additional domestic accommodation was provided to cater for a maximum 1,592 males and 459 females. The bomb store was in Finningley Big Wood.

The station re-opened for flying in May 1944 when No. 18 OTU returned from RAF Bramcote. By the end of that year requirements for operational training had reduced and in January 1945 the OTU was disbanded and the Wellingtons removed.

The Bomber Command Instructors School had been established at Finningley in December 1944 and this organisation, with a variety of bomber types, saw out the remaining months of the war at this station and did not depart until the spring of 1947. Navigational training was the main objective of No. 6 Flying Training School RAF, first using Vickers Varsity and later Hawker Siddeley Dominie aircraft. Although Finningley passed to RAF Support Command in 1977, its training role continued throughout in the next decade before RAF activity was terminated.

Sister RAF stations of RAF Finningley located in and around Doncaster included:

RAF Bawtry
Located at Bawtry Hall in Bawtry this was No 1 Group Bomber Command Headquarters and administration unit. The airfield at RAF Bawtry was operated by RAF Bircotes. RAF Bawtry became the centre of the RAF Meteorological Service and ceased military operations in 1986.

RAF Bircotes
A satellite from RAF Finningley operating Avro Ansons, Wellingtons, and Manchesters from No. 25 OTU. Also operating No. 1 Group RAF Bomber Command HQ Communications Flight in support of RAF Bawtry

RAF Doncaster
First opened in 1908 as one of the world's first airports, it took on biplane fighters during the First World War to combat German Zeppelins and later became a transportation squadron during the Second World War. The runway has now been lost to urban development; however a museum remains.

RAF Lindholme
RAF Lindholme was home to the No 1 Lancaster Finishing School and between 1952 and 1972 was home to the Bomber Command Bombing School (BCBS), later Strike Command Bombing School and Air Navigation School.

RAF Misson
An  bombing range used by No 25 and No 18 OTU at RAF Finningley during the Second World War.  Post-war became a Bloodhound surface-to-air missile battery location as part of 94 Squadron. Now private land. The location of the Bloodhound missile stands are still visible in aerial photographs.

RAF Sandtoft
An Avro Lancaster bomber dispersal airfield, taken over by the United States Air Force in 1957. Part is now a commercial airfield, the rest is under industrial use.

Post Second World War 

From 1946 to 1954 a number of different training units were stationed at Finningley with a variety of aircraft types. No. 616 Squadron RAF was re-formed at Finningley on 31 July 1946 equipped with de Havilland Mosquito NF XXX night fighters which were replaced with Gloster Meteor F.3 day fighters a few months later.

A number of units withdrew in 1954 (including No. 215 ATS) leaving only the Meteors of No. 616 Squadron, Royal Auxiliary Air Force, manned largely by part-time personnel, but their days at Finningley were numbered for in May 1955 the squadron moved to RAF Worksop. The reason was that Finningley was about to be given a new lease of life as a V bomber station.

The Cold War years and after 

During the next two years work was carried out to re-lay and extend the main runway to approximately 3,000 yards (2.7 km). Unit stores for atomic weapons were also constructed to house Green Grass in Yellow Sun, Violet Club and Blue Steel weapons. The airfield became known as the home of the 'V' Bomber after Avro Vulcans, Handley Page Victors and Vickers Valiants had all been stationed at the base. Finningley maintained its nuclear weapon storage facility for many years.

Finningley re-opened in the spring of 1957, No. 101 Squadron was re-formed in October that year to operate Vulcan bombers. A year later No. 18 Squadron RAF with ECM Vickers Valiants was also established at Finningley. In 1961, No. 101 Squadron RAF took its Vulcans to RAF Waddington changing places with the Vulcan training organisation, No. 230 Operational Conversion Unit RAF.

It was two years from 101 Sqn leaving that in 1961, the Valiant having seen its day, No. 18 Squadron was disbanded.

The Vulcan OCU stayed with RAF Finningley from June 1961 until December 1969.

In 1970 there was an arson attack on Number 2 Hangar by a serving RAF member.  After the hangar was locked and secured at 1700hrs he lit a fire under an aircraft, obviously with catastrophic results.  The hangar was badly damaged, and the perpetrator charged and imprisoned.

Handley Page Victor bombers were added to the Finningley scene in later years before RAF Strike Command (the amalgamation of Bomber Command and Fighter Command on 30 April 1968) moved its units out and Training Command took over the station in May 1970.

On 14 January 1992, a new Air Navigation School building was opened, built at a cost of £5.2m.

Arguably the most famous of the Finningley's Avro Vulcan Bombers was aircraft XH558. On 1 July 1960 XH558 was the first Vulcan B.2 to enter RAF service and was immediately transferred to No. 230 Operational Conversion Unit at RAF Finningley before continuing its career. XH558 was restored to flight by the Vulcan to the Sky Trust and the aircraft was displayed during airshows until the end of 2015. On 29 March 2011 XH558 returned to Doncaster airport and Finningley, and she was once again at her original home. XH558 still resides there now, she remains in operating condition but without a permit to fly. Unfortunately, the three expert companies who were supporting the Vulcan in remaining airborne  – BAE Systems, Marshall Aerospace and Defence Group and Rolls-Royce, collectively known as the ‘technical authorities’ - decided to cease their support at the end of the 2015 flying season. Without their support, under Civil Aviation Authority regulations, XH558 is prohibited from flying. Since moving to Doncaster, the Vulcan and Canberra WK163 have been removed from the hangar and have been left outside. Doncaster Council recently approved construction of a special built hangar for XH558 and WK163 but that will take years to construct.

Units
The following units were also here at some point:

Facilities

Aircrew training 

During the 1970s all RAF navigators passed through the Air Navigation School (ANS) of No. 6 Flying Training School (FTS) at RAF Finningley, when the BAe Dominie T.1 s of No. 1 ANS from RAF Stradishall and the Varsities of No. 2 ANS  from RAF Gaydon moved there. In 1970, a Varsity aircraft caught fire in one of Hangars and subsequently destroyed 2 other aircraft by setting them ablaze. Low level navigation training took place on the BAC Jet Provost, eventually using the T.5A variant.

The Vickers Varsity was phased out in 1976 making No. 6 FTS an all-jet school.

RAF Finningley also played host to multi-engine training and operational navigation training again via 6 FTS was responsible for training all the Royal Air Force multi-engine pilots using twin-turboprop Handley Page Jetstream T.1 aircraft.

Later the Jet Provost T.5A aircraft were replaced on 14 August 1993 by the British Aerospace Hawk T.1 aircraft which joined on 10 September 1992 and the Short Tucano T.1 from 6 April 1992.

RAF Finningley was also home to all initial airman aircrew training (Air Electronics Operators, Air Engineers and Air Loadmasters).

Finningley was also home to the Yorkshire Universities Air Squadron, that flew the Scottish Aviation Bulldog at the time, as well as Chipmunk T.10s of No. 9 Air Experience Flight.

In its last years as an RAF station, Finningley was home to 100 Squadron which had moved from RAF Wyton. The squadron's main tasks were as a target facilities flight providing airborne targets for surface-based radar and missile sites, and as a provider of small and agile 'aggressor' aircraft for Dissimilar air combat training (DACT) for UK-based operational aircraft.

RAF Search and Rescue 

The RAF Search and Rescue Wing was first formed at RAF Finningley in 1976, when two squadrons, No. 22 Squadron and No. 202 Squadron, came together from RAF Thorney Island and RAF Leconfield. Finningley became the administrative home of the two squadrons with their bright yellow painted Westland Whirlwind HAR.10, Westland Sea King HAR.3 and Westland Wessex HAR.2 helicopters. All major engineering work was carried out by the Engineering Squadron in Hangar 1. The wing was disbanded on 1 December 1992.

RAF Finningley Battle of Britain Air Display 
The first air display at Finningley was held in September 1945. For two decades RAF Finningley was home to the Battle of Britain Air Display which was the largest one-day airshow event in the country, and a similar show was held in Scotland at RAF Leuchars in Fife on the same day as that at Finningley each year. The aerobatic airshow and the display of military hardware became so well known nationally that the show attracted huge crowds and eventually became televised on national TV. Famous memorable incidents during the airshows include a BAC Lightning breaking the sound barrier above the crowd during a display and an Avro Vulcan bomber scramble.

In 1977, the Queen's Silver Jubilee Air Show was held at RAF Finningley, replacing for that year the Battle of Britain Air Show.

Housing 
In the 1960s substantial housing development took place to accommodate the families. This began with the Spey Drive Estate, at Auckley.

Closure
In 1994 the Ministry of Defence announced the imminent closure of RAF Finningley as part of the Front Line First defence cuts.  It closed in 1996 and three years later Peel Holdings, a property and transport company in the UK bought the land and transformed it into Robin Hood Airport Doncaster Sheffield.

In popular culture

Finningley has made at least one momentary appearance in fiction in the BBC film Threads, before the base is destroyed by a Soviet nuclear warhead.

It is briefly mentioned in the Netflix series The Crown.

Commanding officers

References

Citations

Bibliography

External links

  RAF Finningley Veteran's web-site
 Finningley Picture Gallery
 Report upon Meteor crash August 1952

Metropolitan Borough of Doncaster
Royal Air Force stations in Yorkshire
Royal Air Force stations of World War II in the United Kingdom
Aviation in Doncaster
Military history of South Yorkshire
1915 establishments in England
1996 disestablishments in England
Military installations established in 1915
Military installations closed in 1996